Tisserand's criterion is used to determine whether or not an observed orbiting body, such as a comet or an asteroid, is the same as a previously observed orbiting body.

While all the orbital parameters of an object orbiting the Sun during the close encounter with another massive body (e.g. Jupiter) can be changed dramatically, the value of a function of these parameters, called Tisserand's relation (due to Félix Tisserand) is approximately conserved, making it possible to recognize the orbit after the encounter.

Definition
Tisserand's criterion is computed in a circular restricted three-body system. In a circular restricted three-body system, one of the masses is assumed to be much smaller than the other two. The other two masses are assumed to be in a circular orbit about the system's center of mass. In addition, Tisserand's criterion also relies on the assumptions that a) one of the two larger masses is much smaller than the other large mass and b) the comet or asteroid has not had a close approach to any other large mass.

Two observed orbiting bodies are possibly the same if they satisfy or nearly satisfy Tisserand's criterion:

where a is the semimajor axis, e is the eccentricity, and i is the inclination of the body's orbit.

In other words, if a function of the orbital elements (named Tisserand's parameter) of the first observed body (nearly) equals the same function calculated with the orbital elements of the second observed body, the two bodies might be the same.

Tisserand's relation
The relation defines a function of orbital parameters, conserved approximately when the third body is far from the second (perturbing) mass.

The relation is derived from the Jacobi constant selecting a suitable unit system and using some approximations. Traditionally, the units are chosen in order to make μ1 and the (constant) distance from μ2 to μ1 a unity, resulting in mean motion n also being a unity in this system.

In addition, given the very large mass of μ1 compared μ2 and μ3

These conditions are satisfied for example for the Sun–Jupiter system with a comet or a spacecraft being the third mass.

The Jacobi constant, a function of coordinates ξ, η, ζ, (distances r1, r2 from the two masses) and the velocities remains the constant of motion through the encounter.

The goal is to express the constant using orbital parameters.

It is assumed, that far from the mass μ2, the test particle (comet, spacecraft) is on an orbit around μ1 resulting from two-body solution. First, the last term in the constant is the velocity, so it can be expressed, sufficiently far from the perturbing mass μ2, as a function of the distance and semi-major axis alone using vis-viva equation

Second, observing that the  component of the angular momentum (per unit mass)   is

Substituting these into the Jacobi constant CJ, ignoring the term with μ2<<1 and replacing r1 with r (given very large μ1 the barycenter of the system μ1, μ3 is very close to the position of μ1) gives

See also
Orbital elements
Orbital mechanics
n-body problem

References 

Orbits